The Brussels Intercommunal Transport Company ( or ;  or ) is the local public transport operator in Brussels, Belgium. It is usually referred to in English by the double acronym STIB-MIVB, or by its French acronym, STIB.

It is responsible for the Brussels metro, Brussels trams and Brussels buses, linking with the De Lijn network in Flanders and the TEC network in Wallonia.

History and operation
Founded in 1954, STIB operates 4 metro lines, 18 tram lines and 50 bus lines. It covers the 19 communes of the Brussels Capital Region and some surface routes extend to the near suburbs in the other regions. 329 million trips were made in 2011, a 5.6% increase from the previous year.  Ridership has increased sharply in recent years to 370 million trips in 2015. The company aims for 400 million trips in 2016.

In 1991, STIB had a farebox recovery ratio of 28%. In 2009, following annual increases of 1.56% in passenger journeys and 2.4% in direct revenue, fares covered 54.8% of operating costs.

Transamo
STIB is a shareholder of Transamo, a transport engineering and consultancy firm in Europe that specialises in the project management of public transport projects in France. Transdev is the other major shareholder of Transamo.

References

External links

 MIVB-STIB corporate site

Public transport in Brussels
Transport companies of Belgium
Transport companies established in 1954
Belgian companies established in 1954
Government-owned companies of Belgium